Ghrispura (also known as Gadhram Khurd)  is a village on Guru Gobind Singh Marg,  in Ropar district of Punjab.  It is approximately 5  Km from Chamkaur Sahib (30°53'30.2"N 76°27'33.9"E).  and it is about 40 km to Chandigarh.

Ghirspura is a small farming community with approx. population of 150 of Jatt Sikhs and Mazhabi Sikhs.   Village has elementary school, closest high schools are in Bhaku Marja and in Chamkaur Sahib.  There is a Sikh gurduwara in village.   All Jatt Sikhs in the village carry shahi last name.

History 
Ghrispura's history starts with two Shahi brothers (Deva and Lakha), they moved in mid 19th century from village called Hargana  in Fatehgarh Sahib district of Punjab.    In Hargana, shahi families belong to both Sikh and Hindu religion.   In last fifty years decedents of Deva and Lakha have migrated with in India ( Samalkha, Haryana and Kolkata ) and to foreign lands of Tanzania, UK, USA, Canada and Australia.

References

Villages in Rupnagar district